is a Japanese former football player.

Playing career
Negishi was born in Kanuma on April 20, 1969. After graduating from high school, he joined Japan Soccer League club Honda in 1988. He moved to Sumitomo Metal in 1991. In 1992, the Japan Soccer League folded and a new league J1 League was founded. However, he retired due to injury at the end of the 1992 season before the league competition started.

Futsal career
In 1989, Negishi was selected for Japan national futsal team at the 1989 Futsal World Championship in Netherlands.

Club statistics

References

External links
 

1969 births
Living people
Association football people from Tochigi Prefecture
Japanese footballers
Japanese men's futsal players
Japan Soccer League players
J1 League players
Honda FC players
Kashima Antlers players
Association football defenders